Wagener may refer to:

 Wagener (surname)
 Wagener (apple), a cultivar of apple; parent of the Idared
 Wagener, South Carolina, a town in the United States
 Wagener House (disambiguation), several historic houses in Yates County, New York, United States
 Wagener Stadium, a multi-purpose stadium in Amstelveen, Netherlands

See also